Saatva is an American privately held e-commerce company that specializes in luxury mattresses and is based in New York City with a second major office in Austin, Texas. Launched in 2011, Saatva was one of the first companies to implement the direct-to-consumer business model. The fastest growing major direct-to-consumer mattress brand from 2019 to 2021, Saatva is estimated to bring in close to $500M in direct annual revenue in 2022 with no wholesale channels. In 2015, Saatva ranked 101 on Inc's list of the top 500 retailers for the year. Saatva mattresses launched Loom and Leaf, an eco-friendly brand of luxury memory foam mattresses and their high end 'Zenhaven' mattress in 2016. 

Unlike its direct-to-consumer competition, Saatva does not compress its mattresses in a box.  Rather, the company provides free delivery and mattress removal out of its 19 factories and 159 distribution centers. 

Saatva has since expanded their offering to include luxury bedding, high-end beds and bed frames, and a wide-selection of mattresses in every major category. Saatva has flagship stores in New York City, Washington D.C., Los Angeles, and San Francisco.  Saatva’s retail footprint is expanding rapidly with new stores launching at the pace of one a month in markets such as Boston, Seattle, Chicago, Dallas, Philadelphia, San Diego, and Miami.

History
The company was founded in 2011 by furniture industry veteran Ron Rudzin and entrepreneur Ricky Joshi, who chose to base the company's name off of the Sanskrit word "sattva" which means "pure". Rather than open a brick and mortar store, the two opted to sell their mattresses exclusively online. Their products received positive reception from outlets such as Vogue and Forbes magazine and in 2015, placed on both Forbes' and Internet Retailer's guides for the top companies of that year.

Product and delivery
Saatva sells its mattresses under three brands. Their initial product was the Saatva Luxury Mattress, which featured a coil on coil innerspring. As the company grew, they expanded their product line to incorporate an eco-friendly memory foam mattress, the Loom and Leaf Memory Foam Mattress.  In May 2016, Saatva launched the natural latex brand Zenhaven.

References

Retail companies established in 2010
Cooperatives in the United States
Companies based in Austin, Texas
History of Austin, Texas
Mattress retailers of the United States
2010 establishments in Texas